Alex Hornibrook is a former American football quarterback. The West Chester, Pennsylvania, native attended Malvern Preparatory School and originally committed to the University of Pittsburgh before attending Wisconsin. On March 10, 2019, Hornibrook announced his decision to transfer to Florida State University for his final season of eligibility as an NCAA graduate transfer. After college he played one season for the Jousters of The Spring League.

High school career 
As a junior at Malvern Preparatory School, Hornibrook would study extra film and conduct offensive meetings without the help of a coach. As a senior, there was a coaching/offense change that allowed him to throw more passes, and eventually set school marks for passing touchdowns and passing yards. Hornibrook was rated as a consensus three-star recruit. After originally committing to Pittsburgh, he followed Pitt coach Paul Chryst to the University of Wisconsin over Rutgers University, University of Akron, Yale University and University of Connecticut.

College career
As a freshman at Wisconsin in 2015, Hornibrook was redshirted and did not play.

The following season started with Hornibrook as a backup to senior quarterback Bart Houston. After playing two games as a reserve, Hornibrook earned his first start against Michigan State Spartans. Throughout the season, his playing and leadership skills were at points inconsistent. Although he started the rest of the games, he split playing time with Houston and eventually injured his head against Minnesota on November 26.  After his injury, Hornibrook was replaced by Houston. He was eventually cleared to play in the 2017 Cotton Bowl Classic.

The March after the 2016 season, Hornibrook met with renowned quarterbacks coach George Whitlock Jr. in San Diego. In June, he attended the Manning Passing Academy. Another focus during the offseason was nutrition, as Hornibrook increased his lean body mass while decreasing his body fat.  He was named the Badgers starting quarterback for the 2017 season. Inconsistent non-conference play cast scattered doubts on Hornibrook's ability early in the season, but still performed at a serviceable level. Late in the season, Hornibrook quieted doubts about interception problems in a 31–0 win against Minnesota. In the 2017 Orange Bowl against the Miami Hurricanes, Hornibrook was named the game's MVP after throwing four touchdowns completing 23 of 34 pass attempts, finishing off a 13–1 season. Hornibrook finished his Wisconsin career with the best winning percentage by any starting QB in program  history he went 26-6 as the starting QB with a winning percentage of 81.3%.

On February 27, 2019, Alex Hornibrook announced he was leaving Wisconsin football's program 

On March 10, 2019, Hornibrook announced his intention to transfer to Florida State as a graduate transfer and will be immediately eligible under the NCAA graduate transfer rules.

Statistics
Source:

Professional career
Hornibrook signed with the Jousters of The Spring League in October 2020.

Personal life 
Hornibrook's relatives have played collegiate athletics or professionally in football, baseball, water polo, basketball, swimming and lacrosse. He was an honor roll student in high school.

References

External links
Wisconsin Badgers bio
Scout.com bio
247sports.com bio

Living people
Players of American football from Pennsylvania
Sportspeople from Chester County, Pennsylvania
American football quarterbacks
People from West Chester, Pennsylvania
Wisconsin Badgers football players
Year of birth missing (living people)
Florida State Seminoles football players
The Spring League players